Gabriel Oualengbe Bisse (born 21 May 2004) is a French professional footballer who plays for Paris FC.

Early life 
Having grown up in Gentilly, Val-de-Marne, Gabriel Oualengbe first played for the Paris Université Club, before joining in 2017 the FC Gobelins, an amateur club in the southern 13th arrondissement of Paris. There he stood out in the youth teams, allowing him to be selected for the Madewis Cup 2019, a youth tournament in Lyon, where he reached the final and was named player of the tournament.

Club career 
Having become the captain of the under-17 team of FC Gobelins by the 2019–20 season, Oualengbe joined the Paris FC academy in 2021. He soon started playing with the reserve Parisian team in National 2, becoming a key player of the team by the beginning of the 2022–23 Season.

Oualengbe made his professional debut for Paris FC on the 29 October 2022, starting and playing every minute of a 3–1 away Coupe de France win to Les Ulis.

Personal life
Born in France, Oualengbe is of Central African Republic descent.

Style of play 
Oualengbe has been described as a powerful midfielder, able to deliver long passes with great precision, earning early comparisons to fellow Parisian Paul Pogba.

References

External links

2004 births
Living people
French footballers
French sportspeople of Central African Republic descent
Association football midfielders
Footballers from Val-de-Marne
Paris FC players
Championnat National 3 players